(meaning 'philosophy of life') was a dominant philosophical movement of German-speaking countries in the late 19th and early 20th centuries, which had developed out of German Romanticism.  emphasised the meaning, value and purpose of life as the foremost focus of philosophy.

Its central theme was that an understanding of life can only be apprehended by life itself, and from within itself. Drawing on the critiques of epistemology offered by Schopenhauer and Nietzsche, notable ideas of the movement have been seen as precursors to both Husserlian phenomenology and Heideggerian existential phenomenology.  criticised both mechanistic and materialist approaches to science and philosophy and as such has also been referred to as the German vitalist movement, though its relationship to biological vitalism is questionable. Vitality in this sense is instead understood as part of a biocentric distinction between life-affirming and life-denying principles.

Overview 
Inspired by the critique of rationalism in the works of Arthur Schopenhauer, Søren Kierkegaard, and Friedrich Nietzsche,  emerged in 19th-century Germany as a reaction to the rise of positivism and the theoretical focus prominent in much of post-Kantian philosophy. While often rejected by academic philosophers, it had strong repercussions in the arts.

The  movement bore indirect relation to the subjectivist philosophy of vitalism developed by Henri Bergson, which lent importance to immediacy of experience.

Twentieth-century forms of  can be identified with a critical stress on norms and conventions. The Israeli-American historian Nitzan Lebovic identified  with the tight relation between a "corpus of life-concepts" and what the German education system came to see, during the 1920s, as the proper Lebenskunde, the 'teaching of life' or 'science of life'—a name that seemed to support the broader philosophical outlook long held by most biologists of the time. In his book Lebovic traces the transformation of the post-Nietzschean  from the radical aesthetics of the Stefan George Circle to Nazi or "biopolitical" rhetoric and politics.

This philosophy pays special attention to life as a whole, which can only be understood from within. The movement can be regarded as a rejection of Kantian abstract philosophy or scientific reductionism of positivism.

List of notable theorists

See also 

 Absurdity
 Henri Bergson
 Wilhelm Dilthey
 Essence
 Existence
 Existential crisis
 Ferdinand Fellmann
 Viktor Frankl
 German Idealism
 Pierre Hadot
 Human situation
 Hans Jonas
 Søren Kierkegaard
 Meaning of life
 Self-discovery
 Vitalism
 German Idealism, an antecedent philosophical movement to 
 German Romanticism, an antecedent intellectual movement to 

People indirectly associated with the Lebensphilosophie movement
 Henri Bergson, notable for his studies of immediate experience
 Hannah Arendt, notable for her distinction between vita activa and vita contemplativa
 Pierre Hadot, notable for his conception of ancient Greek philosophy as a bios or way of life
 Giorgio Agamben, notable for his zoe–bios distinction

References

Further reading 
 William James and other essays on the philosophy of life, Josiah Royce
 Existential philosophy, Paul Tillich
Reconsidering Meaning in Life
Philosophy of Life in Contemporary Society

External Links
Academic journals
 Journal of Philosophy of Life

Personal life
Life
German philosophy